Genius of America is the eighth and most recent studio album to date by The Tubes and marked their return to the studio for the first time since 1985's Love Bomb. The band self-produced the album and is their first body of work to include Gary Cambra. The album was released on October 15, 1996.
A CD featuring re-mixed versions of the songs plus two bonus tracks was released in Europe in 1999 as Hoods from Outer Space.

Track listing
"Genius of America" (Cambra, Prince) - 4:00
"Arms of the Enemy" (Cambra, Waybill) - 4:29
"Say What You Want" (Cambra, Waybill) - 4:09
"How Can You Live With Yourself" (Marx, Waybill) - 5:15
"Big Brother's Still Watching" (Lukather, Marx, Waybill) - 5:31
"After All You Said" (Steen, Waybill) - 4:29
"Fishhouse" (Cambra, Prince, Steen) - 4:38
"Fastest Gun Alive" (Anderson, Cambra, Steen, Waybill) - 5:05
"I Never Saw It Comin'" (Cambra, Waybill) - 3:19
"Who Names the Hurricanes" (Cambra, Prince) - 4:50
"It's Too Late" (Steen, Waybill) - 2:52
"Around the World" (Cambra, Waybill) - 4:47

Hoods from Outer Space Track listing
"Hoods from Outer Space" (Cambra, Steen, Waybill) - 4:07
"I Know You" (Lukather, Waybill) - 3:51
"Say What You Want" (Cambra, Waybill) - 4:09
"Around the World" (Cambra, Waybill) - 4:23
"Genius of America" (Cambra, Prince) - 4:13
"Who Names the Hurricanes" (Cambra, Prince) - 4:46
"It's Too Late" (Steen, Waybill) - 2:50
"How Can You Live With Yourself" (Marx, Waybill) - 5:14
"I Never Saw It Comin'" (Cambra, Waybill) - 3:17
"Arms of the Enemy" (Cambra, Waybill) - 4:36
"Fishhouse" (Cambra, Prince, Steen) - 4:36
"Big Brother's Still Watching" (Lukather, Marx, Waybill) - 4:53
"Fastest Gun Alive" (Anderson, Cambra, Steen, Waybill) - 5:03
"After All You Said" (Steen, Waybill) - 4:26

Personnel
Musicians
 Rick Anderson – bass
 Gary Cambra – acoustic guitar, electric guitar, keyboards, vocals
 Richard Marx – acoustic guitar, piano, strings, synthesizer bass, vocals
 Jennifer McPhee – vocals
 David Medd – vocals
 Prairie Prince – drums, percussion, voices
 Roger Steen – acoustic guitar, electric guitar, vocals
 Fee Waybill – vocals
 Anita Whitaker – vocals

Production
 Mike Ainsworth – assistant engineer
 Chris Bellman – mastering
 Bob Biles – engineer
 David Bryant – assistant engineer
 Michael Cotton – concept consultant
 Bill Darm – engineer
 Annamaria DiSanto – photography
 Bill Drescher – engineer, mixing
 Rory Earnshaw – photography
 Kim Foscato – engineer
 Dave Huron – assistant engineer
 Michael Johnson – assistant engineer
 Paul Knotter – concept consultant
 Kenji Nakai – assistant engineer
 Prairie Prince – art direction, design,  photography
 Ralph Provino – concept consultant
 Witold Riedel – art direction

References

The Tubes albums
1996 albums
Albums produced by Richard Marx